The South African Railways Class 32-000 of 1959 was a diesel-electric locomotive.

Between November 1959 and November 1961, the South African Railways placed 115 Class  General Electric type U18C1 diesel-electric locomotives with a 1Co+Co1 wheel arrangement in service in South West Africa.

Manufacturer
The South African Class 32-000 type GE U18C1 diesel-electric locomotive was designed and built to South African Railways (SAR) requirements by General Electric (GE) and imported.

Class 32 series
The Class 32 consisted of two series, the high short hood Class  and the low short hood Class , both GE products and both with a 1Co+Co1 wheel arrangement. The short hood end was the front on both versions and both had single station controls.

The pony truck affair
In the United States of America, the South African Class  is credited with being a major factor in the demise of the American Locomotive Company (Alco) and the rise of GE in the locomotive building business.

In the late 1950s South Africa, at the time one of the last bastions of steam traction, planned to embark on a massive dieselisation program. A SAR technical team was sent to Europe and the United States to prepare an assessment of design alternatives, finalise specifications and compile a list of qualified bidders.

In the United States only Alco, GE and General Motors Electro-Motive Division (EMD) were considered to be qualified bidders. The SAR was not very enthusiastic about two-stroke cycle prime movers and had a strong preference for Alco's Model 251 prime mover and GE's transmission systems. As a long-time prior supplier of steam locomotives for the SAR, Alco appeared to be virtually assured of receiving the order.

The SAR's tender for bid was issued in 1957, with two options:
 115  locomotives with a 1Co+Co1 wheel arrangement; or
 230  locomotives with a Co+Co wheel arrangement

These units were intended for operation in South West Africa under very light rail conditions that necessitated lighter axle loadings which could not be achieved with conventional Co bogies under a heavy locomotive. General Steel Castings had a design on paper for a 1Co bogie, a Co bogie with an integral pony truck, which could be utilised by either Alco or GE and which would enable the SAR's specifications to be met for the heavier  units.

The SAR made it clear that, despite the two options afforded by the tender, its strong preference was for a 1Co+Co1 locomotive. The use of a pony truck was not universally accepted by Alco's engineering management, however, and the result was that Alco bid on only the Co+Co option and lost out to GE, who had bid on both options.

In South Africa, this virtually opened the floodgates for GE since more than half of the SAR's vast diesel-electric locomotive fleet which was acquired between 1959 and 1981 were GE products.

Service

South African Railways

The Class  was designed specifically for service in SWA and most of them spent their entire SAR working lives there.

Some initially entered service at Germiston to work coal trains on the Witbank coal line where electrification was approaching completion. From Germiston they worked all sorts of traffic, including the Trans-Natal Express between Johannesburg and Volksrust. Ten of these units were temporarily allocated to De Aar in the last quarter of 1961 to work the mainline to Beaufort West. Between 1964 and 1976, several were also allocated to the Eastern Transvaal for service around Waterval Boven.

Of the original 115 locomotives, only five survived into the Spoornet era in the 1990s. In SWA they began to be replaced by the Class 33-400 during the early 1970s.

Post-SAR service

After withdrawal from SAR service in the 1980s, almost fifty of the Class  locomotives were sold to Zaire's Société Nationale des Chemins de Fer Zaïrois (SNCZ) which became the Société nationale des Chemins de fer du Congo (SNCC) after the country's name change to the Democratic Republic of the Congo. Of these at least one, SNCC no. 1405 (ex SAR no. ) was seen on local workings around Lubumbashi in 2013.

Three went to Consortium ARZ (CARZ), an Italian per-way contractor working in Zaire and later also in Zambia.

The three locomotives at the Nkana Mine retained their SAR numbers. No.  is depicted alongside on the Nkana-Chibuluma miner's train at Nkana Mine Sidings in Zambia. The coaches behind it are second-hand Tata bus bodies mounted on freight wagon frames and bogies which were initially made for the Mulungushi Commuter train service in Lusaka, which was later taken over by Zambia Railways and renamed Njanji Commuter.

Of these, no.  has been observed shunting in the Merewent Oil Refinery on the Bluff as late as 2014.

Liveries
The class 32-000 were delivered in the new Gulf Red livery with yellow side-stripes and a yellow V on each end. They wore this livery throughout their SAR and Spoornet service life.

Preservation
Four of the Class 32-000's have been preserved. 
32002 incorrectly numbered 32001 is plinthed in Windhoek in Namibia. 
32029 is preserved at The Railway Museum in George.
32042 is preserved at the Outeniqua Choo Tjoe Railway in George.
32047 preserved at Voorbaai Loco Depot.

Works numbers
The Class 32-000 builder's works numbers and known disposition are listed in the table.

Illustration

References

3300
1-C+C-1 locomotives
(1′Co)+(Co1′) locomotives
1Co+Co1 locomotives
General Electric locomotives
Cape gauge railway locomotives
Diesel-electric locomotives of Namibia
Railway locomotives introduced in 1959
1959 in South Africa